Hadiman Hadiman (born 29 November 1950) is an Indonesian former professional tennis player.

Debuting in 1974, Hadiman competed for the Indonesia Davis Cup team in seven campaigns and was a member of the side which won the 1982 Eastern Zone, beating Japan in the final. His last appearance, a 1983 tie against Sweden, was Indonesia's first ever World Group fixture. He retired with a 3–4 overall win–loss record.

Hadiman won the men's doubles gold medal at the 1978 Asian Games, partnering Yustedjo Tarik.

See also
List of Indonesia Davis Cup team representatives

References

External links
 
 
 

1950 births
Living people
Indonesian male tennis players
Asian Games medalists in tennis
Asian Games gold medalists for Indonesia
Asian Games bronze medalists for Indonesia
Medalists at the 1978 Asian Games
Medalists at the 1982 Asian Games
Tennis players at the 1978 Asian Games
Tennis players at the 1982 Asian Games
Southeast Asian Games medalists in tennis
Southeast Asian Games gold medalists for Indonesia
Southeast Asian Games silver medalists for Indonesia
Southeast Asian Games bronze medalists for Indonesia
Competitors at the 1977 Southeast Asian Games
Competitors at the 1979 Southeast Asian Games
Competitors at the 1981 Southeast Asian Games
Competitors at the 1983 Southeast Asian Games
21st-century Indonesian people
20th-century Indonesian people